Cecil Bødker (27 March 1927 – 19 April 2020) was a Danish writer and poet, most known for young adult fiction books about the character "Silas". For her "lasting contribution to children's literature" she received the international Hans Christian Andersen Medal for Writing in 1976.

Biography

Bødker was born in Fredericia, Denmark in 1927.

In 1955 she had her first poems published under the pseudonym Cecil Skar. In 1961 she debuted with the collection of novellas Øjet (The Eye), all treating the condition of human existence estranged from nature. The dystopian critique of civilization continued in Tilstanden Harley (The condition Harley) (1965) and Pap (Cardboard) (1967).

Awards

The biennial Hans Christian Andersen Award conferred by the International Board on Books for Young People is the highest recognition available to a writer or illustrator of children's books. Bødker received the writing award in 1966.

In Denmark she won the annual Danish Critics Prize for Literature (Kritikerprisen) in 1961 and won the Ministry of Culture's children book prize (Kulturministeriets Børnebogspris) in 1968 for Silas og den sorte hoppe. In 1998 she won the Grand Prize of the Danish Academy for her body of work as a writer.

The English-language edition of Leoparden (1970), translated by Gunnar Poulsen and published by Atheneum Press in 1976, won the annual Batchelder Award from the American Library Association as the "children's book considered to be the most outstanding of those books originally published in a foreign language in a foreign country, and subsequently translated into English and published in the United States".

Works 

 1955	Luseblomster (poem) 
 1956	Fygende heste (poem) 
 1956  Generationer  (poem)
 1959	Anadyomene (poem) 
 1961	Øjet (novel) 
 1964	Latter (hearing game) 
 1964	Samlede digte (Collected ed.) 
 1965	Tilstanden Harley (novel) 
 1967	Pap (radioplay) 
 1967	Silas og den sorte hoppe (Young adult) 
 1968	I vædderens tegn (poem) 
 1969	Silas og Ben-Godik (Young adult) 
 1969	Timmerlis (Young adult) 
 1970	Leoparden (The Leopard, Young adult) 
 1971	Dimma Gole (Young adult) 
 1971	Fortællinger omkring Tavs
 1971	Kvinden som gik bort over vandet (radioplay) 
 1972	Salthandlerskens hus
 1972	Silas fanger et firspand (Young adult) 
 1972	Skyld (Acting) 
 1974	En vrangmaske i Vorherres strikketøj
 1975	Barnet i sivkurven
 1975	Da jorden forsvandt
 1975	Far, mor og børn (acting) 
 1975	Jerutte fra Ræverød (Young adult) 
 1975	Jerutte redder Tom og Tinne (Young adult) 
 1976	Jerutte og bjørnen fra Ræverød (Young adult) 
 1976	Silas stifter familie (Young adult) 
 1977	Cecil Bødker - et udvalg (udvalg) 
 1977	Den udvalgte
 1977	Jerutte besøger Hundejens (Young adult) 

 1977	Silas på Sebastianbjerget (Young adult) 
 1978	Silas og Hestekragen mødes igen (Young adult) 
 1979	Silas møder Matti (Young adult) 
 1980	Evas ekko
 1980	Flugten fra Farao
 1981	Tænk på Jolande(Beautiful story telling about the growth of the quiet, shy girl Emilie when she meets her inner self in the strong, adventures girl Jolande)
 1982	Den lange vandring
 1982	Syv år for Rakel
 1983	Marias barn. Drengen
 1984	Marias barn. Manden
 1984	Silas - livet i bjergbyen (Young adult) 
 1985	Silas - de blå heste (Young adult) 
 1986	Silas - Sebastians arv (Young adult) 
 1987	Ægget der voksede (Young adult) 
 1988	Maria fra Nazaret
 1988	Silas - ulverejsen (Young adult) 
 1989	Vandgården
 1990	Hungerbarnet (Young adult) 
 1990	Malvina
 1991	Jordsang (poem) 
 1992	Silas - testamentet (Young adult) 
 1993	Tørkesommer (novel) 
 1995	- men i hvert fald i live (Young adult) 
 1996	Fru Hilde (Young adult) 
 1997	Farmors øre
 1997	Mens tid er
 1998	Silas og flodrøverne (Young adult) 
 2001	Silas - fortrøstningens tid (Young adult) 
 2003	Siffrine

See also

References

External links
Kvinfo profile
Encyclopedia entry

Danish women novelists
Danish children's writers
Hans Christian Andersen Award for Writing winners
2020 deaths
1927 births
Recipients of the Grand Prize of the Danish Academy
Danish women children's writers
Women science fiction and fantasy writers
People from Fredericia